Special cities of Korea may refer to:

 Special cities of North Korea
 Special cities of South Korea